Heterocola is a genus of parasitoid wasps belonging to the family Ichneumonidae.

The species of this genus are found in Europe.

Species:
 Heterocola concava (Uchida, 1956)
 Heterocola linguaria (Haliday, 1838)

References

Ichneumonidae
Ichneumonidae genera